Dave Pietramala (born 1967) is the defensive coordinator for the Syracuse University Men's Lacrosse team and the former head coach for the Johns Hopkins University Men's Lacrosse team. He is widely regarded as one of the greatest defensemen in lacrosse history, and is a member of the U.S. Lacrosse Hall of Fame. He is the only person to win a men's lacrosse NCAA national championship as both a player and coach, and the only person to be named both player and coach of the year.

Playing career
Born in Hicksville, New York, he went to St. Mary's High School. Pietramala chose to attend Johns Hopkins University at the advice of his father, George, who wanted him to play for the lacrosse powerhouse. Dave Pietramala stated that he originally intended to go to the University of Maryland: "I loved Coach [Dick] Edell and loved Maryland ... I grew up a huge basketball fan and they had Len Bias, Keith Gatlin and Lefty Driesell. I thought it was all set. I was going to Maryland."

At Hopkins, Pietramala was a member of the 1987 National Championship team. He won the Schmeisser Award as the nation's top defenseman in 1988 and 1989 and the 1989 Enners Award as the nation's top player. He was also named a first-team All American three times while at Hopkins.

Pietramala also played at the club level for the storied Mount Washington Lacrosse Club in the 1990s, the professional level for the Pittsburgh Bulls in the Major Indoor Lacrosse League, and nationally for the United States Men's National Lacrosse team. He won two world championships in the International Lacrosse Federation World Championship, was named All-World in both 1990 and 1994, and Best and Fairest Player (MVP) in 1990.

In addition to these awards, Pietramala was named to the NCAA Silver Anniversary Team in 1995, the All-Time Johns Hopkins Team, and Lacrosse Magazine's All-Century Team. He was inducted into the National Lacrosse Hall of Fame in 2004.

Coaching career
After 1991, Pietramala took jobs as an assistant coach at Gilman School, Johns Hopkins University, the University of Pennsylvania, and Loyola College before returning to Johns Hopkins as its defensive coordinator in 1995. In 1998 he took over the head coaching job at Cornell University, where he was named the national Coach of the Year in 2000.

In 2001, he took the head coaching position at his alma mater, where he revitalized the Hopkins program. In his 20 years at the helm, the Blue Jays had a 207-93 record, 18 NCAA Tournament appearances, six NCAA Final Four appearances, National Championship game appearances in 2003 and 2008, and the 2005 and 2007 National Championships.

In April 2020, after the 2020 season was cut short by the COVID-19 pandemic, Johns Hopkins announced that they had mutually agreed to part with Pietramala, ending his tenure as the head coach.

Pietramala joined the coaching staff of Boys' Latin School of Maryland in the spring of 2021, assisting on the defensive side of the ball and coaching his two sons, Dominic and Nicholas. An up and down regular season gave way to a hot playoff streak that saw the sixth-seeded Lakers win the MIAA A Conference championship, defeating Archbishop Spalding in the finals.

On Monday, June 14th, 2021, it was announced that Dave Pietramala would be joining the Syracuse University coaching staff, led by Gary Gait, as their defensive coordinator for the spring 2022 season. The unification of this tandem gives the Syracuse coaching staff, arguably, the best offensive and defensive players in the history of the sport.

References

Johns Hopkins Blue Jays men's lacrosse players
Johns Hopkins Blue Jays men's lacrosse coaches
Syracuse Orange men's lacrosse coaches
Cornell Big Red men's lacrosse coaches
1967 births
Living people
Mount Washington Lacrosse Club players
People from Hicksville, New York
Sportspeople from Nassau County, New York
Lacrosse players from New York (state)
Lacrosse defenders
High school lacrosse coaches in the United States
Penn Quakers men's lacrosse coaches
Loyola Greyhounds men's lacrosse coaches